KHNS is an FM-broadcasting public radio station with principal studios and offices in Haines, Alaska and secondary studios in Skagway, Alaska.

KHNS is broadcast throughout the upper Lynn Canal area which includes the communities of Haines, Skagway and Klukwan.

Programming
KHNS is the region's only local radio station and offers a wide variety of programming. Local news is produced by staff in Haines,  but also covers Skagway, which is 14 miles from Haines via Ferry.

KHNS receives statewide news from the Alaska Public Radio Network, national news from National Public Radio, and international news from the BBC. KHNS also subscribes to a variety of nationally syndicated shows. The station also produces local music shows in a variety of genres.

Notably, KHNS is the only Southeast Alaskan public radio station that is not a member of CoastAlaska.

Translator

External links

HNS
NPR member stations
Haines Borough, Alaska
HNS
Radio stations established in 1970
1970 establishments in Alaska